Gerald Nangoli is a Ugandan legislator and member of parliament for Elgon North County in Bulambuli District in the eleventh Parliament of Uganda. He is affiliated to the National Resistance Movement (NRM). In the 11th parliament, Nangoli serves on the Committee on Finance, Planning and Economic Development.

Political career 
He was unopposed in the NRM primaries to become the flag-bearer, contest as Member of Parliament for Elgon North County. Nangoli won the 2021 elections and she became the member of parliament for Elgon North County in Bulambuli District with the majority number of votes. Nangoli sits on the Committee on Finance, Planning and Economic Development in the eleventh Parliament of Uganda which is chaired by Dr. Keefa Kiwanuka.

Other works 
Nangoli has always been fighting against corruption, abuse of office and embezzlement of public funds in the Elgon North County. She called upon the stake holders of the Emyooga funds to increase on sensitization so that people can gain more knowledge on how to benefit from Emyooga funds. She attended the commissioning of kaserem-kapchorwa-road. Nangoli went on a monitoring tour of schools Bulambuli District to check on the state they were in and found out that most of the schools were not renovated due to lack of funds.

See also 

 List of members of the eleventh Parliament of Uganda
 Irene Muloni

References 

Living people
Year of birth missing (living people)
Members of the Parliament of Uganda
Women members of the Parliament of Uganda
21st-century Ugandan women politicians
21st-century Ugandan politicians
National Resistance Movement politicians